Imam Abū ʿAbdullāh Al-Qurṭubī or Abū ʿAbdullāh Muḥammad ibn Aḥmad ibn Abī Bakr al-Anṣārī al-Qurṭubī (121429 April 1273) was an Andalusian Sunni Muslim polymath, Maliki jurisconsult, mufassir, muhaddith and an expert in the Arabic Language. He was taught by prominent scholars of Córdoba, Spain and he is well known for his classical commentary of the Quran named Tafsir al-Qurtubi.

Biography
He was born in Córdoba, Al-Andalus in the 13th century. His father was a farmer and died during a Spanish attack in 1230. During his youth, he contributed to his family by carrying clay for use in potteries. He finished his education in Cordoba, studying from renowned scholars ibn Ebu Hucce and Abdurrahman ibn Ahmet Al-Ashari. After Cordoba's capture in 1236 by king Ferdinand III of Castile, he left for Alexandria, where he studied hadith and tafsir. He then passed to Cairo and settled in Munya Abi'l-Khusavb where he spent the rest of his life. Known for his modesty and humble lifestyle, he was buried in Munya Abi'l-Khusavb, Egypt in 1273. His grave was carried to a mosque where a mausoleum was built under his name in 1971, still open for visiting today.

Views
He was very skilled in commentary, narrative, recitation and law; clearly evident in his writings, and the depth of his scholarship has been recognized by many scholars. In his works, Qurtubi defended the Sunni point of view and criticised the Mu'tazilah.

Reception
The hadith scholar Dhahabi said of him, "..he was an imam versed in numerous branches of scholarship, an ocean of learning whose works testify to the wealth of his knowledge, the width of his intelligence and his superior worth."

Islamic scholar Nuh Ha Mim Keller said of him:

Works
Tafsīr al-Qurṭubī: the most important and famous of his works, this 20 volume commentary has raised great interest, and has had many editions. It is often referred to as al-Jamī' li-'Aḥkām, meaning "All the Judgements". Contrary to what this name implies, the commentary is not limited to verses dealing with legal issues, but is a general interpretation of the whole of Quran with a Maliki point of view. Any claims made about a verse are stated and thoroughly investigated.
al-Tadhkirah fī Aḥwāl al-Mawtà wa-Umūr al-Ākhirah (Reminder of the Conditions of the Dead and the Matters of the Hereafter): a book dealing with the topics of death, the punishments of the grave, the end times and the day of resurrection
Al-Asnà fi Sharḥ al-Asmā' al-Ḥusnà
Kitāb ut-Tadhkār fi Afḍal il-Adhkār
Kitab Sharḥ it-Taqaṣṣi
Kitab Qam' il-Ḥirṣ biz-Zuhd wal-Qanā'ah
At-Takrāb li-Kitāb it-Tamhīd
al-Mufhim lima Ushkila min Talkhis Sahih Muslim

See also
 List of Ash'aris and Maturidis
 List of Islamic scholars

References

External links

 Biodata at MuslimScholars.info
  Selections from the Introduction of Tafsir Al Qurtubî
  Fatwâ of Al Qurtubî about the Ayat Mutashabihat
  The Secret of Adhan by Imâm Al Qurtubî

1214 births
1273 deaths
13th-century Muslim scholars of Islam
13th-century jurists
Asharis
13th-century writers from al-Andalus
Maliki scholars from al-Andalus
People from Córdoba, Spain
Quranic exegesis scholars
Sunni Muslim scholars of Islam
Sunni imams